The Best Record-Breaking Performance ESPY Award has been presented since 2001 to the amateur or professional sportsperson, irrespective of nationality or sport contested, adjudged to have, in a single play, game, or season, completed the best record-breaking (and -setting) performance, irrespective of the nature of the record broken.

Between 2001 and 2004, the award voting panel comprised variously fans; sportswriters and broadcasters, sports executives, and retired sportspersons, termed collectively experts; and ESPN personalities, but balloting thereafter has been undertaken exclusively by fans over the Internet from amongst choices nominated by the ESPN Select Nominating Committee.

Through the 2001 iteration of the ESPY Awards, ceremonies were conducted in February of each year to honor achievements over the previous calendar year; awards presented thereafter are conferred in June and reflect performance from the June previous.

List of winners

See also
Sports records and statistics

References

ESPY Awards
Sports records and statistics
Awards established in 2001